Roslyn Savings Bank Building is a historic commercial building located at Roslyn in Nassau County, New York.  It was originally built on the site of the former Roslyn Hotel in 1932, with additions dated to 1963 and 1980.  The original structure consists of a one-story banking hall with a gable roof, with a two-story flat roofed office block in a Georgian Revival style.  The original front facade is five bays wide with a center entrance and features an elaborate, pedimented stone surround.

It was added to the National Register of Historic Places in 1986.

References

External links

Roslyn, New York
Bank buildings on the National Register of Historic Places in New York (state)
Georgian Revival architecture in New York (state)
Commercial buildings completed in 1932
Buildings and structures in Nassau County, New York
National Register of Historic Places in North Hempstead (town), New York